"Better Off Alone" is a song by Grinspoon which was released as the second single from their fourth studio album Thrills, Kills & Sunday Pills.

The song peaked at No. 30 on the ARIA Singles Chart and polled at No. 26 on Triple J's Hottest 100 of 2004.

Track listing

Charts

References

2004 singles
Grinspoon songs
2004 songs
Universal Records singles
Song recordings produced by Howard Benson
Songs written by Phil Jamieson
Songs written by Pat Davern